Randy Davis (born July 14, 1952) is an American politician. He is a former member of the Alabama House of Representatives from the 96th District, serving from 2002 to 2019. He is a member of the Republican party.

References

Living people
Republican Party members of the Alabama House of Representatives
1952 births
21st-century American politicians